Martin Koči (born 5 April 1993) is a Slovak rally driver. He is currently racing in the JWRC.

WRC results

JWRC

*not eligible for points

WRC2 results

IRC results

External links 

 eWRC-results.com profile

1993 births
Slovak racing drivers
Living people
World Rally Championship drivers
European Rally Championship drivers
Intercontinental Rally Challenge drivers